Taçi Oil is an Albanian petroleum company and oil distributor in Albania headquartered in Tirana.

The company's revenue for 2012 was €350 million. and had over 290 petrol stations through Albania and over 850 employees.

In 2009 Taçi Oil purchased the Albanian oil refinery ARMO (Anika Mercuria Refinery Associated Oil, owned by Anika Enterprises) for €128 million.

On September 9, 2011 Taci Oil became an official sponsor of AC Milan.  Beginning in 2008, in fact, Taci Oil was the main sponsor of Milan Junior Camp in Tirana. Since its founding, the camp has hosted about 1400 Albanian youths.

In 2013 Taçi Oil sold 80% of the assets of ARMO, the oil refining business to Heaney Assets Corporation, an Azerbaijan corporation.

See also 
 Economy of Albania

References

External links  
 Official Website

 

Oil companies of Albania
Petroleum in Albania
Albanian brands